Stump the Guesser is a Canadian short film by Guy Maddin, Evan Johnson and Galen Johnson, which was released in 2020. A silent black-and-white film based on early Soviet cinema tropes, it stars Adam Brooks as a man who works as a guesser at the fair, but whose mindreading tricks suddenly begin to fail him; simultaneously, he meets a long-lost sister he never knew he had and falls in love with her, and sets out to disprove the theory of heredity in hopes of being able to marry her.

The film premiered on February 25, 2020 at the 70th Berlin International Film Festival.

The film was named to the Toronto International Film Festival's year-end Canada's Top Ten list for short films in 2020.

References

External links

2020 films
2020 short films
Films directed by Guy Maddin
Canadian black-and-white films
Canadian silent short films
2020s English-language films
2020s Canadian films
Canadian avant-garde and experimental short films